Robert Larson may refer to:

 Robert L. Larson (1898 – 1986), a former Justice of the Iowa Supreme Court
 Robert J. Larson (1932 –), a former member of the Wisconsin State Assembly

See also
Robert Larsen (disambiguation)
Robert Larsson (1967–2018), Swedish professional ice hockey player